Gypsophila perfoliata, the perfoliate gypsophila, is a species of plant in the family Caryophyllaceae.

References 

perfoliata